Venetia Dearden (born 1975) is a British photographer and filmmaker. Her books include Somerset Stories, Fivepenny Dreams (2008), Glastonbury, Another Stage (2010), Mulberry 40 Years (2011) and Eight Days (2012).

Dearden had a solo exhibition of her Glastonbury photographs at the National Portrait Gallery in London in 2010 and was awarded the Vic Odden Award from the Royal Photographic Society in 2011. Her work is held in the collection of the National Portrait Gallery.

Biography
Dearden was born in Brecon, Wales. She grew up in Somerset, England.

She has an MA in Anthropology, Comparative Religion and History of Art from the University of Edinburgh (1998) and undertook postgraduate studies in Photojournalism at the London College of Printing (1999–2000).

Her photographs of local families living close to the land first brought her work to international attention in 2008, on publication of her book Somerset Stories, Fivepenny Dreams, which took six years to make.

In 2011 Dearden undertook a two-year commission from Mulberry to shoot a book celebrating the company's 40th anniversary.

Publications

Publications by Dearden
Somerset Stories, Fivepenny Dreams. Berlin: Kehrer, 2008. .
Glastonbury, Another Stage. Berlin: Kehrer, 2010. .
Mulberry 40 Years. Chilcompton, UK: Mulberry, 2011. Edited by Georgia Fendley. .
Eight Days. Berlin: Kehrer, 2011. .

Publications paired with others
Tangier: Notes from Late Summer. Khbar Bladna, 2015. With Elena Prentice.

Publications with contributions by Dearden
Rise: Images of Life Change. Dubai: Legatum; London: Foto8, 2010. Edited by Jon Levy. . With text by Max Houghton and photographs by Dearden and others.

Awards
Vic Odden Award from the Royal Photographic Society, 2011

Exhibitions
Glastonbury: Another Stage, solo exhibition, National Portrait Gallery, London, 2010

Collections
Dearden's work is held in the following public collection:
National Portrait Gallery, London: 11 prints (as of May 2018)

References

External links

"Glastonbury: Another Stage by Venetia Dearden" – gallery of photographs at The Guardian
"Mulberry at 40 - in pictures" – gallery of photographs at The Guardian

Living people
1975 births
People from Brecon
Welsh women photographers
21st-century British photographers
21st-century Welsh artists
Photographers from Somerset
21st-century women photographers